Toba people (Surat Batak: ᯅᯖᯂ᯲ ᯖᯬᯅ) also referred to as Batak Toba people are the largest group of the Batak people of North Sumatra, Indonesia. The common phrase of ‘Batak’ usually refers to the Batak Toba people. This mistake caused by the Toba people being the largest sub-group of the Batak ethnic and their differing social habit to self-identify as merely Batak instead of ‘Toba’ or ‘Batak Toba’, contrary to the habit of the Karo, Mandailing, Simalungun, Pakpak communities who commonly self-identified with their respective sub-groups.

The Toba people are found in Toba Samosir Regency, Humbang Hasundutan Regency, Samosir Regency, North Tapanuli Regency, part of Dairi Regency, Central Tapanuli Regency, Sibolga and its surrounding regions. The Batak Toba people speak in the Toba Batak language and are centered on Lake Toba and Samosir Island within the lake. Batak Toba people frequently build in traditional Batak architecture styles which are common on Samosir. Cultural demonstrations, performances and festivities such as Sigale Gale are often held for tourists.

Paleontological research done in Humbang region of the west side of Toba Lake suggests that human activity had existed 6,500 years ago. The genetic test of the Toba Batak people shown that the Toba Batak are the descendants of different people with distinct genetic components. The ancestors of the Toba Batak are the people migrated from Formosa, The Philippines, Southern India, Indochina (Burma, Thailand, Vietnam, Cambodia), and South China thousands years ago.

History

Batak kingdoms 

There were numerous kingdoms and dynasties in the history of the Batak and Toba Batak people. The last dynasty in the Toba Batak people is the Sisingamangaraja dynasty with twelve successive priest kings called ‘Sisingamangaraja’ from the Sinambela clan. During the time when the Batak kingdom was based in Bakara, the Sisingamangaraja dynasty of the Batak kingdom divided their kingdom into four regions by the name of Raja Maropat, which are:
 Raja Maropat Silindung
 Raja Maropat Samosir
 Raja Maropat Humbang
 Raja Maropat Toba

Dutch colonization 

The Dutch colonization starts with the defeat of King Sisingamangaraja XII, ending the thirty years Batak War. The Dutch colonization formally began with the annexation of the  Onafhankelijke Batak-Landen or ‘The Free Batak-Country’ into The Dutch East Indies and the formation of Tapanuli Residency in 1910. The Tapanuli Residency is divided into four regions that is called afdeling (in Dutch language means, section); and today it is known as regency or city, namely:
 Afdeling Padang Sidempuan, which later became South Tapanuli Regency, Mandailing Natal Regency, Padang Lawas Regency, North Padang Lawas Regency and Padang Sidempuan.
 Afdeling Nias, which later became Nias Regency and South Nias Regency.
 Afdeling Sibolga and Ommnenlanden, today it is Central Tapanuli Regency and Sibolga.
 Afdeling Bataklanden, which later became North Tapanuli Regency, Humbang Hasundutan Regency, Toba Samosir Regency, Samosir Regency, Dairi Regency and Pakpak Bharat Regency.

Japanese occupation 

During the Japanese occupation of the Dutch East Indies, the administration of the Tapanuli Residency had little changes.

Post independence of Indonesia 

After the independence, the government of Indonesia retain Tapanuli as Residency. Dr. Ferdinand Lumban Tobing became the first Tapanuli Resident.

Although there were changes made to the name, but the division of the region was still the same.

Just as it was in the past, the government of the Tapanuli Residency were divided into four districts, namely:
 Silindung Regency
 Samosir Regency
 Humbang Regency
 Toba Regency

Transfer of sovereignty in early 1950 

During the transfer of sovereignty in the early 1950s, the Tapanuli Residency that was unified into North Sumatra province were divided into four new regencies, namely:-
 North Tapanuli Regency (previously known as Tanah Batak Regency)
 Central Tapanuli Regency (previously known as Sibolga Regency)
 South Tapanuli Regency (previously known as Padang Sidempuan Regency)
 Nias Regency

Present 

In December 2008, the Tapanuli Residency was unified under North Sumatra province. At the moment, Toba is under the Toba Samosir Regency's region with Balige as its capital.

Culture 

The Toba Batak people practices a distinct culture. The central foundation of their culture is the customs or adat called ‘Dalihan Na Tolu’ (meaning ‘The Three Legged Stove’). The Toba Batak is generally regarded as a patriarchal society. While the role of men is central in the Toba Batak society, the role of women is very crucial with the existence of the Toba Batak concept of ‘Hula hula‘ where women and their families hold a higher ground in familial relations. With the conversion to Christianity of the Toba Batak people in the 19th century, Christianity played a vital part of the life of Toba people with church ordination influenced the customs and regulations of the Toba Batak life. Traditional Toba Batak's adat ceremonies are often present in sacraments such as baptism, confirmation, marriage, and burial, while the church hymns, psalms, prayers are often involved and invoked in traditional ethnic Toba Batak ceremonies.

The Toba Batak people are known to possess a robust tradition of ‘Mangaranto‘ or becoming migrants to look for better education, social and economic opportunities. There is no obligation  for Toba people to live in the Toba region, although they are obliged to be attached to their original village in Toba. The original village or Bius of a Toba Batak person is called ‘Bona Pasogit‘. It is often for a Toba Batak person to identify his/her origin not by their birthplaces, but by their Bona Pasogit in ‘Tano Batak‘ or ‘The Batak Land’.

Just as it is with other ethnicities, the Toba people have also migrated to other places to look for better life. For example, majority of the Silindung natives are the Hutabarat, Panggabean, Simorangkir, Hutagalung, Hutapea and Lumbantobing clans. Instead all those six clans are actually descendants of Guru Mangaloksa, one of Raja Hasibuan's sons from Toba region. So it is with the Nasution clan where most of them live in Padangsidimpuan, surely share a common ancestor with their relative, the Siahaan clan in Balige. It is certain that the Toba people as a distinct culture can be found beyond the boundaries of their geographical origins. According to the folklore of the Batak people, the first ancestor of the Batak people is Si Raja Batak , literally means ‘King Batak’ or ‘the King of Batak’. His origin is believed to be from a Toba village known as Sianjur Mula village, situated on the slopes of Mount Pusuk Buhit, about 45 minutes drive from Pangururan, the capital of Samosir Regency today.

The Toba Clans and Families 

A surname or family name (marga) is part of a Toba person's name, which identifies the clan or family they belonged to. The Batak Toba people always have a surname or family name. The surname or family name is obtained from the father's lineage (paternal) which would then be passed on to the offspring continuously. Nainggolan, Napitupulu, Pardede, Gultom, Panggabean, Silalahi, Siahaan, Simanjuntak, Sihombing, Sitorus, Panjaitan,  Sitompul, Marbun, Lumban Tobing, Aritonang, Pangaribuan, Manurung, Marpaung, Hutapea, Tambunan, Silitonga, Tampubolon, Sinaga, Sidabutar, Aruan, Ambarita, and Simatupang are among the popular surnames. However, the number of all Toba Batak clans are in hundreds.

Traditional house 

The traditional house of the Toba people is called rumah bolon. It is a rectangular building that can house up to five or six families. One can enter a rumah bolon through a staircase in the middle of the house with odd numbers of steps (odd number of staircase means offspring of slave, even number of staircase means offspring of king). When a person enters the house, one must bow in order to avoid one's head from knocking the transverse beam at the entrance of the traditional house. The interpretation of this is that the guests must respect the owner of the house.

Boat 

The traditional boat of the Toba Batak people is the solu. It is a dugout canoe, with boards added on the side bound with iron tacks. The boat is propelled by sitting rowers, who sit in pairs on cross seats.

Views of Toba people in Indonesian culture
The Toba Batak are known throughout Indonesia as capable musicians, and are perceived as confident, outspoken and willing to question authority, expressing differences in order to resolve them through discussion. This outlook on life is contrasted to Javanese people, Indonesia's largest ethnic group, who are more culturally conciliatory and less willing to air differences publicly. Batak Toba people also known as professing christians in contrast with the largely muslim population in Indonesia. In terms of occupational sector, Batak Toba is also known to be well represented in some sectors particularly law, education, military, economy, and politics.

Religion 

An overwhelming  majority of the Toba Batak people are adherents of Christianity. The value and practice of Christianity are absorbed deeply into the daily life of the Toba people in combination with the practice of Toba traditional customs known as Adat. The currently pertaining traditional law, customs, and regulations used by most Batak Toba people to regulate their social relations nowadays were products of discussions between the Christian Toba Batak Rajas with the German Missionaries during the 1886 to evaluate the pre-Christian customs of the Toba Batak society to be inline with Christian values and Church Ordinance. The result of this discussion is the codification of Batak Toba customs by the Christian Rajahs and the Missionaries into two treaties:  Ruhut Parsaoron di Habatahon 1898  or The Customs regulating the social life of the Batak (referred to as Ruhut), and  Patik dohot Uhum ni Halak Batak 1899  or Laws and Regulations of the Batak people (referred to as Patik).

Most of the Toba people are adherents of Protestantism with Lutheranism as the biggest denomination. After Protestantism, Catholicism is the second largest religious belief among the Toba People. Being the largest ethnic group in the Indonesian Protestant community, it is common for Protestant churches in Indonesia to provide service in Toba Batak language.

The first Protestant missionaries who tried to reach the Batak highlands of inner Northern Sumatra were English and American Baptist preachers in the 1820s and 1830s but without any success. After Franz Wilhelm Junghuhn and Herman Neubronner van der Tuuk did intensive research on Batak language and culture in the 1840s, a new attempt was done in 1861 by several missionaries sent out by the German Rhenish Missionary Society (RMG). The first Bataks were baptized during this year. In 1864, Ludwig Ingwer Nommensen from the German Rhenish Missionary Society reached the Batak region and founded a village called "Huta Dame" (village of peace) in the district of Tapanuli in Tarutung, North Sumatra.

The Batak Christian Protestant Church (Huria Kristen Batak Protestan (HKBP)) is the largest Protestant church in Indonesia. It was founded by the German missionaries and still regarded as the traditional church of the Toba Batak people. In the early 20th century, HKBP disported into several independent Protestant churches such as GKPS (Simalungun) and GKPA (Angkola) to accommodate church services for the Batak people outside of the Toba community.

Before the conversion to Christianity, the old belief of the Toba Batak tribe was a mixture of Animism and Hinduism with significant influence of Islam. In the beginning of the 20th century, some Toba Batak Rajahs who refused to embrace Christianity instituted a religion inspired by the pre-Christian Toba Batak beliefs, customs and practices. This religion is called ‘ Ugamo Malim ‘ with its adherents called Parmalim. The Parmalims worship Debata Mula Jadi Nabolon, which means The Great Almighty  God.

A minority of Toba Batak are adherents of Sunni Islam. Many of the Muslim Toba Batak are originated from port of Barus, Sorkam, parts of Sibolga, and from Asahan areas. They are generally regarded as the original Toba Batak Muslims, although, sometimes the Batak Muslims from these regions are identified and self-identified as distinct sub-group known as ‘Orang Pesisir’ or ‘Batak Pesisir’ and ‘Batak Pardembanan’ (Asahan). In some cases of conversion to Islam, there are occurrences of Toba Batak Muslims disassociating themselves with Toba Batak customs and identity and prefer association with other ethnic identities (e.g. of their spouses) or to disassociate ethnic identity at all. This would cause the departure from the traditional Toba Batak customs and adoption of the more conventional Islamic customs in instances such as wedding or burial, as many aspects of the former are now seen as no longer compatible with Islamic standard.

See also

Toba medicine container

References

Further reading 

 
 Giglioli, Henry Hillyer (1893). Notes on the Ethnographical Collections Formed by Dr. Elio Modigliani During His Recent Explorations in Central Sumatra and Engano in Intern. Gesellschaft für Ethnographie; Rijksmuseum van Oudheden te Leiden (1893). Internationales Archiv für Ethnographie volume VI. Getty Research Institute. Leiden : P.W.M. Trap.

Ethnic groups in Indonesia
Ethnic groups in Sumatra
History of Sumatra
Ethnography
Batak
Batak ethnic groups